The Antiochian Orthodox Archdiocese of Australia, New Zealand and the Philippines is an archdiocese of the Antiochian Orthodox Church, with headquarters in Sydney, Australia. Its current primate is  Basilios (Kodseie), Metropolitan of Australia, New Zealand and the Philippines. The archdiocese has approximately 37,500 members.  

The archdiocese and the parishes are under the jurisdiction of the Patriarchate of Antioch, based in Damascus, Syria. The canonical jurisdiction of the Metropolitan of Hong Kong and South East Asia which belongs to the Ecumenical Patriarchate of Constantinople does not recognize the claim of this diocese over the Philippine Islands which also canonically falls under the Metropolis of Hong Kong.

History
The first lay members of the Antiochian Orthodox Church in Australia are thought to have come to Sydney about 1870, but the first Antiochian Orthodox priest, Nicholas Shehadie, was appointed in 1913 as Patriarcal Exarch. A second parish was formed in Melbourne in 1937. The archdiocese was formed in 1970 with Bishop Gibran Rimlawi as head. A second Sydney church was opened in Punchbowl in 1974. There are now four churches in Sydney, a small center in Wollongong, two churches in Melbourne, and groups in Adelaide and Brisbane. There are three communities in New Zealand.

Exarch Nicholas Shehadie and his two sons, both priests.  Provides a partial history of the Archdiocese between 1913-1987.
View the complete history of the Archdiocesan website.

Organization
The Antiochian Orthodox Archdiocese is a single archdiocese which covers several countries. The Archbishop resides in Australia, there is a Deanery for New Zealand, and presences in other countries of the Pacific Ocean region.  There are 25 parishes and missions across Australia, 8 parishes and missions in the Deanery of New Zealand, and approximately 37,500 members.  

The archdiocese formerly had a female monastery of Saint Anna in Preston, Victoria, Australia, but this has since closed and its monastic presence relocated to the Antiochian Village in Goulburn, New South Wales. The archdiocese also founded the multi-jurisdictional Melbourne Institute of Orthodox Christian Studies.

The Antiochian Orthodox Archdiocese of Australia, New Zealand and the Philippines, was a founding member of Eastern Hierarchs, where all eastern rite jurisdictions, except the largest, are represented. The Antiochian Archdiocese believes this organisation is a friendly effective organisation, working for the Love of God spreading throughout the whole Mystery of His Church.

Primates in Australia and New Zealand 
 Bishop Gibran (Ramlawey) of Australia, New Zealand, and All Oceania, 1969-1999.
 Metropolitan Archbishop Paul (Saliba) of Australia, New Zealand, the Philippines and All Oceania, 1999–2017.
 Metropolitan Archbishop Basilios (Kodseie), since 2017

See also 
Antiochian Orthodox Christian Mission in the Philippines
History of Eastern Christianity in Asia

References

External links
Official website of the Archdiocese, including:
Antiochian parishes in Australasia
Official website of the New Zealand Deanery
Complete Orthodoxwiki article on the Archdiocese

Eastern Orthodoxy in Australia
Eastern Orthodoxy in New Zealand
Greek-Australian culture
Greek-New Zealand culture
Australia New Zealand Philippines
Eastern Orthodox dioceses in Oceania
Eastern Orthodox dioceses in Asia